Damdoi  is a township in Dêngqên County, in the Tibet Autonomous Region of China. It lies at an altitude of 3,789 metres. It has a population of about 5,912 (2008).

See also
List of township-level divisions of the Tibet Autonomous Region

Populated places in Chamdo
Township-level divisions of Tibet